The Subprefecture of Cidade Ademar is one of 32 subprefectures of the city of São Paulo, Brazil.  It comprises two districts: Cidade Ademar and Pedreira.

See also
 Roman Catholic Diocese of Santo Amaro

References

External links
 Roman Catholic Diocese of Santo Amaro

Subprefectures of São Paulo